Daniel Bruce Poneman (born March 12, 1956) is an American government official who was the United States Deputy Secretary of Energy from 2009 to 2014 and is currently a Distinguished Fellow at the Paulson Institute at the University of Chicago. Poneman was Acting Secretary of Energy in 2013 following the resignation of Steven Chu until Ernest Moniz was confirmed and sworn in.

Education
Poneman received A.B. and J.D. degrees with honors from Harvard University, and an M.Litt. in politics from Oxford University, where he was a student at Lincoln College. He is a graduate of Whitmer High School in Toledo, Ohio.

During his undergraduate studies at Harvard, Poneman was a roommate of Hugh Hewitt, who want on to become a nationally syndicated conservative radio host and commentator. Poneman has frequently been a guest on Hewitt's radio show, The Hugh Hewitt Show.

Career
Daniel B. Poneman was nominated by President Barack Obama to be United States Deputy Secretary of Energy on April 20, 2009, and was confirmed by the United States Senate on May 18, 2009. He also served as Chief Operating Officer of the Department of Energy. Poneman served as Acting Secretary of Energy following the resignation of Secretary Chu on April 22, 2013 until his successor, Ernest Moniz was confirmed by the Senate and was sworn in on May 21, 2013.

Poneman was a principal of The Scowcroft Group, a consulting firm in Washington, D.C., in the eight years prior to his appointment to the United States Department of Energy. Before his consulting role, Poneman was also a partner in the law firm of Hogan & Hartson. Between 1993 and 1996, Poneman served as Special Assistant to the President and Senior Director for Nonproliferation and Export Controls at the National Security Council. He joined the NSC staff in 1990 as the Director of Defense Policy and Arms Control after also serving as a White House Fellow in the United States Department of Energy.

Poneman currently sits on the Atlantic Council's Board of Directors and serves as President and Chief Executive Officer at Centrus Energy Corp.

Publications
Poneman has published widely on national security issues and is the author of Nuclear Power in the Developing World and Argentina: Democracy on Trial. His third book, Going Critical: The First North Korean Nuclear Crisis (coauthored with Joel Wit and Robert Gallucci), received the 2005 Douglas Dillon Award for Distinguished Writing on American Diplomacy. Poneman is a member of the Council of Foreign Relations.

Honors
 Order of the Rising Sun, 2nd Class, Gold and Silver Star (2020)

References

External links

 Daniel B. Poneman, Deputy Secretary of Energy on Energy.gov
 

|-

1956 births
21st-century American politicians
Alumni of Lincoln College, Oxford
Harvard Law School alumni
Living people
Obama administration cabinet members
Politicians from Toledo, Ohio
United States Deputy Secretaries of Energy
United States Secretaries of Energy
University of Chicago fellows
Recipients of the Order of the Rising Sun, 2nd class
Harvard College alumni